The Jersey City Public Schools is a comprehensive community public school district located in Jersey City, in Hudson County, New Jersey, United States. The district is one of 31 former Abbott districts statewide that were established pursuant to the decision by the New Jersey Supreme Court in Abbott v. Burke which are now referred to as "SDA Districts" based on the requirement for the state to cover all costs for school building and renovation projects in these districts under the supervision of the New Jersey Schools Development Authority.
As of the 2019–20 school year, the district, comprised of 39 schools, had an enrollment of 29,113 students and 2,173.0 classroom teachers (on an FTE basis), for a student–teacher ratio of 13.4:1.

The district is classified by the New Jersey Department of Education as being in District Factor Group "B", the second lowest of eight groupings. District Factor Groups organize districts statewide to allow comparison by common socioeconomic characteristics of the local districts. From lowest socioeconomic status to highest, the categories are A, B, CD, DE, FG, GH, I and J.

The district was one of three districts in New Jersey (along with Newark Public Schools and Paterson Public Schools) under "state intervention", which authorizes the state Commissioner of Education to intervene in curriculum functions. In 2017, Jersey City became the first school district in New Jersey to regain full local control after having been under "state intervention".

Awards, recognition and rankings
Academy I Middle School was one of nine public schools recognized in 2017 as Blue Ribbon Schools by the United States Department of Education. Dr. Ronald E. McNair Academic High School was one of 18 schools statewide (and three public high schools) honored in 2018 by the National Blue Ribbon Schools Program, marking the second time the school was recognized by the program. Infinity Institute was honored by the National Blue Ribbon Schools Program in 2019, one of nine schools in the state recognized as Exemplary High Performing Schools.

McNair Academic High School was the second-ranked public high school in New Jersey out of 328 schools statewide in New Jersey Monthly magazine's September 2012 cover story on the state's "Top Public High Schools", after being ranked second in 2010 out of 322 schools listed. William L. Dickinson High School is the oldest high school in the city and James J. Ferris High School is represented by some of the top students of Jersey City who are members of the National Academy Foundation Magnet Programs. Academy I Middle School is one of the top middle schools in the country. Has been recognized with several achievements, including first place in the Lexus Environmental Challenge in 2008.

Dr. McNair Academic High School was named as a "Star School" by the New Jersey Department of Education, the highest honor that a New Jersey school can achieve, in the 1994-95 school year.

Alexander D. Sullivan School was recognized by Governor Jim McGreevey in 2003 as one of 25 schools selected statewide for the First Annual Governor's School of Excellence award.

School uniforms
Students have been required to wear school uniforms since 1998.

Schools
Schools in the district (with 2019–20 enrollment data from the National Center for Education Statistics) are:

Elementary schools

Elementary schools

Elementary schools in the district are:
 Frank R. Conwell School P.S. 3 (642 students; grades PreK-5)
Darren Mischel, Principal
 Jotham W. Wakeman School P.S. 6 (664; PreK-5)
Joseph Apruzzese, Principal
 Charles E. Trefurt School P.S. 8 (755; PreK-5)
Marisa Migliozzi, Principal
 Julia A. Barnes School P.S. 12 (356; was PreK-8)
Don Howard, Principal
 Cornelia F. Bradford School P.S. 16 (812; PreK-5)
Terry Watkins-Williams, Principal
 Dr. Maya Angelou School P.S. 20 (689; PreK-5)
Hani Ileya, Principal
 Rev. Dr. Ercel F. Webb School P.S. 22 (680; PreK-5)
Dr. Janine Anderson, Principal
 Nicholas Copernicus School P.S. 25 (669; PreK-5)
Diane Pistilli, Principal
 Patricia M. Noonan School P.S. 26 (467; PK-5)
Anne Beirne, Principal
 Gladys Cannon Nunery School P.S. 29 (292; PreK-5)
Robert O'Connor, Principal
 Alexander D. Sullivan School P.S. 30 (577; PreK-5)
Dr. Martha Osei-Yaw, Principal
 Dr. Paul Rafalides School P.S. 33 (438; PreK-4)
Janeen Maniscalco, Principal
 Gerard J. Dynes N.J. Regional Day School (73; Ungraded)
Colleen Williams, Principal

Grammar schools

Grammar schools in the district are:
 Dr. Michael Conti School P.S. 5 (721; PreK-8)
John Rivero, Principal
 Dr. Martin Luther King Jr. School P.S. 11 (865; PreK-8)
Cleopatra Wingard, Principal
 Ollie E. Culbreath Jr. School P.S. 14 (442; PreK-8)
Sharon Abbruscato, Principal
 Whitney M. Young Jr. School P.S. 15 (645; PreK-8)
David Herman, Principal
 Joseph H. Brensinger School P.S. 17 (1,283; PreK-8)
Dr. Robert Brower, Principal
 Mahatma Gandhi School P.S. 23 (1,363; PreK-8)
Dr. Peter Mattaliano, Principal
 Chaplain Charles Watters School P.S. 24 (762; K-8)
Rosalyn Barnes, Principal
 Alfred E. Zampella School P.S. 27 (901; PreK-8)
Blanca Jackson, Principal
 Christa McAuliffe School P.S. 28 (1,012; PreK-8)
Frank Borroto, Principal
 President Barack Obama Elementary School P.S. 34 (445; PreK-8)
Shante Jones, Principal
 Rafael De J. Cordero y Molina School P.S. 37 (814; PreK-8)
Derek Stanton, Principal
 James F. Murray School P.S. 38 (795; PreK-8)
Sandra Jones, Principal
 Dr. Charles P. DeFuccio School P.S. 39 (350; PreK-8)
Dawn Reynolds, Principal
 Fred W. Martin Center for the Arts (481; PreK-8)
Glenda Jennings, Principal

Middle schools

Middle schools in the district are:
 Frank R. Conwell M.S. 4 (767; 6-8)
Richard Stellato, Principal
 Frank L. Williams M.S. 7 (896; 6-8)
Jaimie Barnaskas, Principal
 Ezra L. Nolan M.S. 40 (303; 6-8)
Troy Smith, Principal
 Academy I Middle School (463; 6-8)
Dr. Margaret Freeman, Principal

High schools

High schools in the district are:
 William L. Dickinson High School Academy of the Sciences (1,812; 9-12)
Gekson Casillas, Principal
 James J. Ferris High School Academy of International Enterprise (1,298; 9-12)
Deneen Alford, Principal
 Infinity Institute (NA; 6-12)
Dr. Treniere Dobson, Principal
 Innovation High School (309; 9-12)
Yvonne Waller, Principal
 Liberty High School (231; 9-12)
Monica Grazilla, Principal
 Lincoln High School Academy of Governance and Social Sciences (677; 9-12)
Chris Gadsden, Principal
 Dr. Ronald E. McNair Academic High School (693; 9-12)
Tom Macagnano, Principal
 Henry Snyder High School Academy of the Arts (708; 9-12)
Yvonne Waller, Principal

Administration

Core members of the district's administration are:
 Dr. Norma Fernandez, Acting Superintendent
 Regina Robinson, Business Administrator / Board Secretary

Board of Education
The district's board of education is comprised of nine members who set policy and oversee the fiscal and educational operation of the district through its administration. As a Type II school district, the board's trustees are elected directly by voters to serve three-year terms of office on a staggered basis, with three seats up for election each year held (since 2013) as part of the November general election. The board appoints a superintendent to oversee the district's day-to-day operations and a business administrator to supervise the business functions of the district.

State intervention
The district was formerly one of three districts in New Jersey under "state intervention", which authorizes the Commissioner of Education to intervene in governance of a local public school district (and to intervene in the areas of instruction and program, operations, personnel, and fiscal management) if the Commissioner has determined that a school district failed or was unable to take corrective actions necessary to establish a thorough and efficient system of education.

On October 4, 1989, the New Jersey Department of Education established a State-operated School District for Jersey City, appointing a State District Superintendent to serve as the governing authority for the District instead of the Board of Education, and a new Board of Education was created and functioned as an advisory body. In 2005 the legislature disbanded state operation and created "state intervention". The Jersey City Board of Education assumed control of governance and finance on April 17, 2008. As of October 2010, although governance had been restored to local control in the form of an elected school board, the state district superintendent remained to manage personnel and curriculum functions. Local control for personnel was returned to the district in 2012. In July 2017, Jersey City regained full local control with curriculum and programming being returned to the district.

References

External links

 Jersey City Public Schools

 School Data for the Jersey City Public Schools, National Center for Education Statistics

New Jersey Abbott Districts
New Jersey District Factor Group B
School districts in Hudson County, New Jersey
Public Schools